Pselnophorus kutisi is a moth of the family Pterophoridae. It is found in the United States, where it has been recorded from Texas and Florida.

The ground color of the forewings is light drab mixed with dark fuscous and sparse light buff scales. The hindwings are uniform light drab. Adults are on wing in June and November in Florida and from mid-May to June in Texas.

Etymology
The species is named for John Stephen Kutis, who collected one of the paratypes.

References

Oidaematophorini
Moths described in 2014